The Scottish Junior Football Central District Second Division was fourth-tier division of the West Region of the Scottish Junior Football Association.

The three highest-placed teams at the end of the season were promoted to the Central District First Division.

In 2018, the lower leagues in the West Region were reorganised, no longer being split geographically, with the result that the Central First and Second Divisions and the Ayrshire Division merged and were separated into two tiers (League One and League Two).

Member clubs for the 2016–17 season

Season summaries

1 Stonehouse Violet folded on 11 January 2012 and withdrew from the league. Their playing record was expunged.

References

External links
West Region Central Division Two at Non-League Scotland (archive version, 2007-08 membership)

3
2002 establishments in Scotland
2018 disestablishments in Scotland
Sports leagues established in 2002
Sports leagues disestablished in 2018